The 1952 Belgian motorcycle Grand Prix was the fourth race of the 1952 Motorcycle Grand Prix season. It took place on the weekend of 6 July 1952 at the Circuit de Spa-Francorchamps.

500 cc classification

350 cc classification

Sidecar classification

References

Belgian motorcycle Grand Prix
Belgian
Motorcycle Grand Prix